Venerable Prohor of Pčinja, also known as Saint Prohor Pčinjski, was a Christian monk and contemporary of St. Gavril of Lesnovo and St. John of Rila who lived in the eleventh century Bulgaria and after its conquest in the Byzantine Empire.

Prohor Pcinjski was born into a Bulgarian family in the Ovče Pole area, then in the First Bulgarian Empire, today in North Macedonia. According to tradition, the young ascetic Prohor was shown in a vision a place near the Pčinja River where he would be a hermit. For many years, nobody disturbed him, until one day a hunter chasing a deer came across the saint, who was in prayer. The hunter engaged the monk in conversation, which went on for hours. As he prepared to take his leave, the hunter asked for the saint's blessing, upon which St. Prohor foretold that greatness awaited him. The hunter, Romanos Diogenes, became Byzantine emperor in 1068. The emperor sought out the prophetic hermit but found his grave instead. The church of the St. Prohor Pčinjski Monastery was built by the generosity of the emperor, as a sign of his thanksgiving to God and the saint. There is an icon in the monastery church that shows St. Prohor's encounter with Emperor Romanos Diogenes. Also shown are wild animals approaching him without fear such as a deer.

Hermits before Prohor of Pčenja, John of Rila, Joachim of Osogovo, Peter of Koriša and those after them have exerted an influence both social and cultural on the people of the Balkan Peninsula during the Middle Ages.

References 

Medieval Bulgarian saints
Serbian saints of the Eastern Orthodox Church
11th-century Christian monks
11th-century Byzantine monks
1067 deaths